Wuhlebecken is a lake in Berlin, Germany. At an elevation of 33 m, its surface area is 6 ha.

Lakes of Berlin
Marzahn-Hellersdorf